Australia Marches with Britain is a 1941 Australian documentary made for wartime propaganda.

It features on introduction by the then Minister of Information H.S. Foll.

Synopsis
The documentary examines Australia's contribution to the war effort, including production of food, munitions and equipment.

Production
The film was originally made for export to England, to be used there by the British Ministry of Information as part of an intensive long term Empire publicity campaign. However, it was then decided to release the film in Australia as well.

The film ended up being widely screened throughout Allied countries, including the UK and US.

Reception
It was critically praised, The Sydney Morning Herald writing that "there is inspiration as well as imagination and drama in this film."

References

External links
Australia Marches with Britain at IMDb
Full copy of film at National Film and Sound Archive YouTube Channel

Australian World War II propaganda films